The .400 Taylor Magnum is a rifle cartridge. It was derived from "a modified .505 Gibbs, necked down to 0.375 inches". The .408 Cheyenne Tactical and the .375 Cheyenne Tactical were later based on the .400 Taylor Magnum.

References

Pistol and rifle cartridges
Wildcat cartridges